Assad Ullah Shah was the MLA from Kupwara constituency of Jammu and Kashmir from 1977 to 1983 and President of the National Conference of Kupwara. He was also the member of the Quit Kashmir Movement and close to Sheikh Abdullah.

Political activism

Assad Ullah Shah started his political career with the Quit Kashmir Movement. He was jailed for five years. In  1977 he was elected to Member Jammu and Kashmir Legislative Assembly

References

People from Kupwara district
1926 births
2004 deaths
Jammu and Kashmir MLAs 1977–1983